The Sturmgewehr 52 (STG-52) was a battle rifle manufactured by the government-owned W+F Bern of Switzerland. It was chambered in the 7.5mm Kurzpatrone cartridge and later the 7.5mm Swiss service round as the Sturmgewehr 54, which was fed from the right-hand side. The Sturmgewehr 52 was heavily patterned after the German FG 42 as it was fed from the side from a 30- or 40-round magazine and was also fitted with a muzzle attachment capable of launching rifle grenades.

See also
 SIG 510

References

German Automatic Rifles 1941-45: Gew 41, Gew 43, FG 42 and StG 44, by Chris McNab,  Osprey Publishing, page 67

FG 42 derivatives
Rifles of Switzerland
Weapons and ammunition introduced in 1952